Oceanswell is Sri Lanka's first marine conservation and research education organisation and was founded by marine biologist Asha de Vos.

Projects

The Blue Whale Project 
Oceanswell is known for the Blue Whale Project which is the first long-term study on blue whales in the Northern Indian Ocean. The project focuses on the conservation of blue whales from threats such as ship strikes. De Vos founded the Blue Whale Project which is the flagship project of Oceanswell.

Conservation research 
Research includes the COVID-19 and Fisheries Project, natural variability of Mount Lavinia Beach, effectiveness of shark fishing bans and advocacy research against beach nourishments conducted without Environmental Impact Assessments. Recent publications advocate against 'parachute science'  which is practice of Western scientists collecting data in developing countries and leaving without training in the region.

Education and outreach 
Oceanswell conducts educational sessions for school children, skill building courses, marine conservation field courses, monthly gatherings for individuals of different fields to discuss marine conservation issues,  rscues stranded marine animals and conducts awareness on species.

Awards 
Honoured as a Goodwill Champion at the 2020 World Economic Forum in Davos.

References 

Environmental organisations based in Sri Lanka
Marine conservation organizations
Marine biologists
Research groups